Salle Airport , also known as Musikot Airport, is a domestic airport located in Musikot  serving Western Rukum District, a district in Karnali Province in Nepal. It is the main tourist gateway to Mount Sisne.

History
The airport was originally opened in 1994. The airport was renovated and the runway blacktopped in 2014 after previously only having a grass/clay runway.

Facilities

Airlines and destinations

References

Airports in Nepal
Airports established in 1994
1994 establishments in Nepal
Buildings and structures in Western Rukum District